Philip Casnoff (born August 3, 1949) is an American actor, known for his roles in TV series and on Broadway. He has also been a director.

Early life and education 
Philip L. Casnoff was born on August 3, 1949, in Philadelphia, Pennsylvania. He attended and graduated in the 226th Class from Central High School in Philadelphia, Pennsylvania in 1967. Casnoff attended and graduated in 1971 from Wesleyan University.

Filmography

Film

Television

Stage

Soundtrack

Singles

References

External links 
 
 
 Central High School of Philadelphia - 226th Class

American male television actors
American male stage actors
1949 births
Living people
Wesleyan University alumni
Central High School (Philadelphia) alumni
Male actors from Philadelphia